Reggie Austin (born January 7, 1979) is an American actor. He is best known for his recurring roles on the Notes from the Underbelly as Dr. Greg Wise,  The Starter Wife as Devon Marsh, Desperate Housewives as Renee Perry's ex-husband Doug Perry, Pretty Little Liars as Eddie Lamb, and Devious Maids as Reggie Miller.

Personal life
As a theater studies major at Yale University, he appeared in numerous stage productions, including starring roles in Macbeth and Othello. After graduation, Reggie moved to New York City, where he performed on stage and in several films before relocating to Los Angeles in 2005.

Filmography

Film

Television

References

External links

Living people
American male film actors
American male television actors
21st-century American male actors
1979 births
Male actors from New York (state)